Maurice Rudolph Black (1915–2000) was an American politician from Mississippi. Black served in the Mississippi House of Representatives from 1948 to 1964.

Black was born on October 18, 1915, in Madison County, Mississippi. He graduated from Hinds Junior College in 1935, then attended Millsaps College. He earned a law degree from Jackson School of Law in 1938. He was elected to the Mississippi House of Representatives in 1947 and took office in 1948. He served in that role through 1964. In 1969, he was appointed as assistant attorney-general. He retired from this role in 1977.

Black died on September 16, 2000, at his home in Flora, Mississippi from complications due to Parkinson's disease.

References

External links 

1915 births
2000 deaths
Members of the Mississippi House of Representatives